Southwest LRT Trail is a system of shared-use paths for bicycles and pedestrian paths that extends through several western suburbs of Minneapolis, Minnesota. They are operated by the Three Rivers Park District. Two former rail corridors originally built by the Minneapolis and St. Louis Railway were acquired and converted to trails in anticipation of the Southwest Corridor light rail project. The two former railway corridors are now divided into three distinct trails.

Trail segments

Cedar Lake LRT Regional Trail
The Cedar Lake LRT Regional Trail is the main paved path running from the west end of the Midtown Greenway in Minneapolis through St. Louis Park to Hopkins, Minnesota. This trail is named very similarly to the Cedar Lake Trail in Minneapolis and the North Cedar Lake Regional Trail continuation of that trail (formerly known as the Hutchinson Spur Trail) which also extends through St. Louis Park to Hopkins in a roughly parallel route farther north. The North Cedar Lake Regional Trail meets the Cedar Lake LRT Regional Trail just east of the intersection of US 169 and Excelsior Boulevard in Hopkins. The trail runs along the right-of-way of the former Minneapolis and St. Louis Railway's main line to Iowa and Illinois. The rail line was built in 1870, and was eventually acquired by the Chicago and North Western Railway, who abandoned the line in 1990. The Cedar Lake LRT trail is temporarily closed for the Southwest LRT project, while the North Cedar Lake trail remains open.

Minnesota River Bluffs LRT Regional Trail

The Minnesota River Bluffs LRT Regional Trail is a trail that extends  along the former Minneapolis and St. Louis right-of-way that brought the trail to Hopkins. It has a crushed limestone surface. It runs from the Hopkins Depot through Hopkins, Minnetonka, Eden Prairie, and Chanhassen. This trail has a partial closure south from Pioneer Trail in Chanhassen since 2014 due to significant mudslides and unsafe conditions and a detour is posted. Reconstruction of the damaged trail section was scheduled for summer 2020. The trail has about 250,000 people in attendance annually. The trail features bluffs of the Minnesota River and the lakes and forests of the area. The pedestrian bridge on the trail that spans Valley View Road replaced a  railway bridge. Dubbed the Graffiti Bridge, it was featured in a 1990 Prince film. The bridge was a bottleneck in the growing city of Eden Prairie, and was demolished in 1991.

The route of the Southwest LRT light rail line is being built to follow the entire Cedar Lake LRT Regional Trail and a portion of the Minnesota River Bluffs LRT Regional Trail before turning southward near Shady Oak Road in Minnetonka.

Lake Minnetonka LRT Regional Trail

The trail uses a crushed limestone surface. It is connected to the Minnesota River Bluffs LRT trail via "The Artery" along 8th Avenue South in Hopkins, which opened in 2018. The trail is on the  right-of-way for a rail line originally built by the Minneapolis and St. Louis in the 1890s and abandoned by the Chicago and North Western in 1980, one which branched off the old M.&St.L. main at Hopkins and went out to South Dakota. There are about 471,000 people on the trail each year. Some places along the trail include Lake Minnetonka, restaurants in Hopkins and Excelsior, and historic places such as the Old Log Theatre and the Cottagewood General Store.

See also 
Bicycle commuting
List of shared-use paths in Minneapolis
Rail trail

References

External links
 Minnesota River Bluffs Trail information from the Three Rivers Park District

Rail trails in Minnesota
Parks in Minnesota
Shared-use paths in Minneapolis
Transportation in Carver County, Minnesota
Transportation in Hennepin County, Minnesota
Chanhassen, Minnesota
Chicago and North Western Railway
Protected areas of Carver County, Minnesota
Protected areas of Hennepin County, Minnesota